The Ministry of Health (MPOS), is the regional executive department of the Bangsamoro Autonomous Region in Muslim Mindanao (BARMM)  for health affairs in the region.

The ministry was reorganized from the former regional office of the Department of Health in the former Autonomous Region in Muslim Mindanao (ARMM). The first Minister of Public Order and Safety is Safrullah Dipatuan who was appointed by Murad Ebrahim on February 26, 2019.

Ministers

Notes

References

Health
Bangsamoro